Emily Stang Sando (born 8 March 1989) is a Norwegian handball goalkeeper for SG BBM Bietigheim and the Norwegian national team.

She made her international debut in 2010.

Achievements
European Championship:
Winner: 2014, 2020

References

External links

1989 births
Living people
Norwegian female handball players
Norwegian expatriate sportspeople in Denmark
Norwegian expatriate sportspeople in Germany
Sportspeople from Tønsberg